Witch House is a fantasy novel by American writer Evangeline Walton.  It was published in 1945 by Arkham House in an edition of 3,000 copies.  It was the first full-length novel to be published by Arkham House and was listed as the initial book in the Library of Arkham House Novels of Fantasy and Terror. An expanded version, with a newly written 20,000-word prologue, was published in England in 1950. In 2013, Centipede Press issued the first American edition of this revised version, also including previously unpublished writings by Walton and several of her short stories.

According to Robert Weinberg, the volume was Arkham House's greatest flop - an excellent novel that took nearly two decades to go out of print.

E. F. Bleiler described the novel as a "Neo-Gothic thriller... [marked by] imaginative writing, a good climax, but a prolonged, dull first section and characterizations that do not click." The Encyclopedia of Fantasy found it to be "an atmospheric Haunted-Dwelling tale".

References

Sources

External links
 https://www.goodreads.com/book/show/2378596.Witch_House
 http://www.arkhamhouse.com/

1945 American novels
American fantasy novels
American horror novels
Novels by Evangeline Walton